Beautiful Noise is a 1976 album by Neil Diamond, and its title track.

Beautiful Noise may also refer to:

Film and television
Beautiful Noise (film), a 2014 music documentary 
Beautiful Noise (TV series), a 2006 music television series

Music
Beautiful Noise (Lee Kernaghan album), 2012 recording, or its title track
Beautiful Noise, 2000 album by Steve Hofmeyr
Beautiful Noise, 2005 album by Salim Nourallah
Beautiful Noise, 2008 album by A Fragile Tomorrow
A Beautiful Noise (musical), 2022 production based on the life and music of Neil Diamond

Songs
"Beautiful Noise", title track from the 1976 album of the same name by Neil Diamond 
"A Beautiful Noise", 2020 song by Alicia Keys and Brandi Carlile song
"Beautiful Noise", 2003 song by The Diplomats from Diplomatic Immunity